400 South Tryon, formerly called the Wachovia Center, is a skyscraper in Charlotte center city, North Carolina. When it was being built, there were rumors that the developer intended to add ten more floors to pass Bank of America Plaza, and become the tallest building in Charlotte. It is now the 15th tallest building. Construction of the building began in 1972 and was completed in 1974.

See also
 List of tallest buildings in Charlotte
List of tallest buildings in North Carolina

References

Skyscraper office buildings in Charlotte, North Carolina
Office buildings completed in 1974